Michael James Busch (born November 9, 1997) is an American professional baseball second baseman in the Los Angeles Dodgers organization. He played college baseball for the North Carolina Tar Heels.

Amateur career
Busch attended Simley High School in Inver Grove Heights, Minnesota, where he played football, hockey and baseball. Busch was ranked as the fourth-best player in the state of Minnesota by Perfect Game. During his senior baseball season, Busch was an All-State selection. Undrafted out of high school in the 2016 Major League Baseball draft, he enrolled at the University of North Carolina to play college baseball for the North Carolina Tar Heels.

In 2017, as a freshman at North Carolina, Busch appeared in 55 games, hitting .215 with three home runs and 22 RBIs. After the season, he played in the Northwoods League for the St. Cloud Rox. As a sophomore in 2018, Busch broke out, starting all 64 of North Carolina's games, batting .317 with 13 home runs and 63 RBIs. He batted .636 during the NCAA Tournament's Chapel Hill Regional and was named the Most Outstanding Player, helping lead North Carolina to the 2017 College World Series. He was named to the All-ACC Second Team. Following the season, he played in the Cape Cod Baseball League for the Chatham Anglers, where batted .322 with six home runs in 27 games and was named to the All-Cape League Team. Prior to the 2019 season, Busch was named a preseason All-American by multiple media outlets, including Perfect Game and Baseball America. Over 65 games, he batted .284 with 16 home runs and 57 RBIs.

Professional career
Considered one of the top prospects for the 2019 Major League Baseball draft, Busch was selected by the Los Angeles Dodgers with the 31st overall pick. He signed with the Dodgers on July 5 for a $2.31 million bonus. He appeared in ten games in the Dodgers farm system in 2019, split between the Arizona League Dodgers and Great Lakes Loons, and had three hits in 24 at-bats. Busch played for the Glendale Desert Dogs of the Arizona Fall League following the season. He did not play a minor league game in 2020 since the season was cancelled due to the COVID-19 pandemic. For the 2021 season, he was assigned to the Tulsa Drillers. In June, Busch was selected to play in the All-Star Futures Game at Coors Field. Busch appeared in 107 games for the Drillers, hitting .267 with twenty home runs and 67 RBIs. He was selected as a post-season Double-A Central All-Star. He returned to Tulsa to begin the 2022 season. After batting .306 with 11 home runs and 29 RBIs over 31, games he was promoted to the Oklahoma City Dodgers, where he hit .266 in 111 games with 21 homers and 79 RBIs. 

After the season, the Dodgers added Busch to the 40-man roster. Busch was optioned to Triple-A Oklahoma City to begin the 2023 season.

References

External links 

North Carolina bio

Living people
1997 births
Baseball players from Minnesota
North Carolina Tar Heels baseball players
St. Cloud Rox players
Chatham Anglers players
Minor league baseball players
Arizona League Dodgers players
Great Lakes Loons players
Tulsa Drillers players
Oklahoma City Dodgers players